Shock is a 2006 Indian Telugu-language action film directed by Harish Shankar and produced by Ram Gopal Varma. The film stars Ravi Teja and Jyothika, while Tabu, Subbaraju, and Ravi Kale play supporting roles. The music was composed by Ajay–Atul with editing by Bhanodaya. It released on 9 February 2006. In 2013, the film was dubbed in Hindi as Mera Insaaf. The film was remade in Kannada as Prince (2011) starring Darshan.

Plot 
Sekhar and Madhurima are a happily married couple who work for an advertising company. Nagesh and Divakar are notorious encounter specialists. They shoot Sekhar, mistaking him to be a Maoist. After realizing their mistake, they frame him as a Maoist by planting proof. Lawyer Dharma Reddy cheats on his client Sekhar and makes sure that he gets eight-year imprisonment. Madhu meets Geeta, an investigative journalist. As Madhu and Geeta unite to get clues, Nagesh and Diwakar force Madhu to commit suicide. Sekhar feels devastated upon learning of his wife's suicide. How Sekhar, with the help of Geeta, seeks revenge against Nagesh and Divakar and proves his innocence forms the rest of the story.

Cast

Production
Ram Gopal Varma was to produce a film starring Ravi Teja directed by Prawaal Raman of Darna Mana Hai fame in Telugu. Ravi Teja wanted a Telugu person as the director, and Harish Shankar was brought on board.

Soundtrack

The music was composed by Ajay–Atul and released on Aditya Music.

Release 
The film was a box office failure and Harish Shankar did not direct another film for five years.

References

External links 
 

2006 films
2000s Telugu-language films
Films directed by Harish Shankar
Films scored by Ajay–Atul
Indian action films
Telugu films remade in other languages
Indian films about revenge
2006 directorial debut films
2006 action films